The Things We Can't Stop is the sixth album by American rock band Cold. It was released on September 13, 2019 in the US through Napalm Records. The album was produced by Jeremy Parker, who produced the previous album. This is Cold's first album since 2011's Superfiction. This is Cold's only album to include guitarist Nick Coyle and first to feature bassist Lindsay Manfredi and their first album not to include bass player Jeremy Marshall and the only album to not feature drummer Sam McCandless. Aaron Fulton was credited as the drummer.

The first single "Shine" was released on June 27, 2019, along with an accompanying lyric video on the same date.

Release and promotion
The album was released on September 13, 2019 on CD, vinyl and digital platforms. To promote the album, the band began the Broken Human tour in selected areas in the United States in fall 2019.

The music video for "Without You" was released on September 18, 2019

Critical reception
James Christopher Monger of AllMusic called the album "commercial-grade active rock angst made with great care and sincerity" that "resonates, but on a mostly superficial/ripped-from-the-headlines level".

Accolades

Track listing
All songs written by Scooter Ward, except where noted.

Personnel
Cold
Scooter Ward – lead vocals, rhythm guitar, piano
Nick Coyle – lead guitar, backing vocals, lead vocals (track 12)
Lindsay Manfredi – bass

Additional musicians
Aaron Fulton – drums (tracks 1-9, 11)
Ethan York – drums (track 10)

Additional personnel
Tom York – executive production
Jeremy Parker – production
Andy VanDette – mastering

Charts

References

Cold (band) albums
2019 albums
Napalm Records albums